The Rapava is a Georgian surname from the Samegrelo region in western Georgia.

The Rapava family name comes from these towns of Samegrelo: Zugdidi, Tsalenjikha, Kortskheli, Akhalkakhati, Rukhi, Tchkaduashi, Kakhati and Shamgona.

References 

Georgian-language surnames